Jalahalli is a suburb in northern part of Bengaluru is one of the greenest areas of Bengaluru. It is mainly divided into Jalahalli East and Jalahalli West. Gangamma Circle is the junction between the roads connecting Jalahalli East, Jalahalli West, Jalahalli Village, and Jalahalli Cross.  The National Academy of Customs and Narcotics in Bengaluru is located here.

Jalahalli East has land on Jakarbandi State Forest. It houses major industrial companies like Bharat Electronics Limited (BEL), Hindustan Machine Tools (HMT), CMTI and other PSUs. This area also houses various private industries, including the packaging unit of Tata Tea Ltd, and other small-scale industries. The Air Force Station, Jalahalli East is located between Gangamma circle and MS Palya. MS Palya is also connected to Vidyaranyapura while Jalahalli West Airforce station is near Jalahalli Cross and the Jalahalli metro station. 

Jalahalli West, Kuvempu Nagar, has coconut grove and eucalyptus plantations. It includes the Indian Air Force Training Command, Ayyappan Temple and surrounding areas like Shettihalli, etc. This place is connected to the NH48 (Tumakuru highway) at Jalahalli Cross, and Jalahalli East at Gangamma Circle. The other landmarks in Jalahalli include BEL Market, Gangamma Circle, Jalahalli Village and Jalahalli Cross.

The neighbouring areas of Jalahalli include Gangamma Circle, Kuvempu Nagar, Kamagondana Halli, Siddhartha Nagar, Peenya, Abbigere Ramachandrapura, Hebbal, Vidyaranyapura, Dasarahalli, Mathikere, and Yeswanthpur.

Places of Worship
 Sri Mathamma Temple (Siddhartha Nagar)
 Muthayalamma Temple
 Sharadamba Temple
Shani Mahatma temple.
 Ebenezer Marthoma Church
 BEL Ganesha Temple
 Jalahalli Sree Ayyappan Temple
 Sarva Murthy Temple
 St. Thomas Church
 St. Stephen's Church
 Our Lady of Fatima Church
 St. Mary's Orthodox Church (Now St. Mary's Orthodox Valiyapally)
 Raghavendra Mutt
 Anjaneya Temple
 CSI Krupalya Church, KG Halli
 Sharon Baptist Church, KG HAlli
 SDA Church, KG Halli
 St. Marys Cross Station, KG Halli
 St. Antony Chapel, Siddhartnagar
 Sri Rama Temple, KG Halli.
 Holy Bible Church, Kuvempu Nagar.

Educational institutions
 M.N.Degree College by arun
 BEL Primary School
 BEL CBSE School
 BEL College
 Cluny Convent School
 Kendriya Vidyalaya No.1 Jalahalli
 Kendriya Vidyalaya No.2 Jalahalli
 Jalahalli Public School
 St. Claret School & College
 Air Force Technical College
 Sree Ayyappa Education Centre
 MN Poly Technic, KG Halli
 St. Stephen School, KG Halli
 Ashoka School and Polytechnic, KG Halli
 SDA English School, KG Halli
 Sharon English School
St Paul college, Nagasandra
AES high school, KG Halli.
Sri Vidya Public School, KG Halli.

Parks and entertainment

Transport
The area is connected by Bangalore Metropolitan Transport Corporation. Following are the buses connecting the area with major areas/bus terminus of the city.

BMTC Bus with number:

271D, 271J connects Jalahalli with Kempegowda Bus Station/Majestic.
271J connects Jalahalli with K R Market.
270C connects Jalahalli with Shivajinagar.
273C from Majestic to Jalahalli Cross.
258 buses are starts from majestic to nelmangala and it connects jallahali.

Current settlements
Jalahalli Village is surrounded by large government organizations that started shortly after independence.

Developments

Jalahalli area is dotted with small scale industries all over. Its proximity to Peenya industrial area has influenced the kind of work force availability.

The Bangalore International Airport [BIAL], located at Devanahalli, has added to the floating population.

The opening of Ring road has led to some more developments. There are hotels like Movenpick Hotel, ATMs, schools, and other basic amenities.

People 

R. Ashok BJP Leader and former Dy. Chief Minister of Karnataka

S. Ramesh, Congress leader, former Karnataka Minister  and past president of the Karnataka Film Chamber

In Movies and Books 

The 1979 Kannada film "Arivu" (Awareness) directed by Katte Ramachandra was shot in Jalahalli (BEL Colony and BEL School) in the late 70s.

The Killer of Jalahalli (a leopard) is one of the stories in the book called Nine Maneaters and One Rogue by written by Kenneth Anderson.

Location

References

External links
 Jalahalli Guide
 Jalahalli East
 Jalahalli West
 Bengaluru International Airport

Neighbourhoods in Bangalore